Read Elding was a man of mixed British and African descent who served as acting governor of the Bahamas from 1699–1701.

In 1699 Elding was appointed by governor Webb to lead a fleet of five ships against piracy. In the process, he brought in a ship he claimed was an abandoned prize. The ship's captain later came forward and claimed Elding and associates had seized it from him.

When Webb removed to Delaware, Elding was made acting governor. Elding had previously lived for a time in Boston.

Sources
Craton and Saunders. Islanders in the Stream. p. 106
PBS frontline article on Ebling

References

British governors of the Bahamas